Edwards Gap is a pass at about  through the Walton Mountains, southward of Mount McArthur, on Alexander Island, Antarctica. It was named by the UK Antarctic Place-Names Committee for Christopher W. Edwards, a British Antarctic Survey geologist at Stonington Island, 1973–75, who mapped this area.

See also

 Russian Gap
 Snick Pass
 Whistle Pass

References 

Mountain passes of Alexander Island